Leptenicodes is a genus of longhorn beetles of the subfamily Lamiinae, containing the following species:

 Leptenicodes gracilis (Fauvel, 1906)
 Leptenicodes quadrilineatus Breuning, 1953

References

Enicodini